Picacho Army National Guard Heliport , also known as Picacho Stagefield Heliport, formally Marana Auxiliary Army Airfield No. 1 (Picacho Field), is an Arizona Army National Guard towered training field  southeast of Picacho, Arizona. The airport is owned and operated by the United States Army. The field serves as a training facility for the Western Army National Guard Aviation Training Site based out of Pinal Airpark.

Picacho ARNG Heliport is a towered airfield that does not have Class D Airspace ring around the airport on the Phoenix sectional chart; this is due to it being a heliport. Picacho ARNG Heliport should be considered Class D Airspace and the chart instructs pilots to CTC PCA TWR WITHIN 4 NM BELOW 2500 FT AGL.

Marana Auxiliary Army Airfield No. 1 (aka Picacho Field) was one of five auxiliary fields that served Marana Army Air Field (now: Pinal Airpark) and is part of many Arizona World War II Army Airfields. Picacho Field first appeared on the Phoenix sectional chart in 1945.

Facilities 
Picacho ARNG Heliport has four asphalt paved runways/helipads:
 Helipad H1 measuring 
 Helipad H2 measuring 
 Helipad H3 measuring 
 Helipad H4 measuring

See also 
 Pinal Airpark
 Arizona World War II Army Airfields
 List of airports in Arizona

References

External links 

Airports in Pinal County, Arizona
Aviation in Arizona